Yusufkhel or Yosuf Khel is a district of Paktika Province, Afghanistan. The estimated population in 2019 was 28,691.

References

Districts of Paktika Province